Catriona (pronounced "ka-TREE-nah" is a feminine given name in the English language. It is an Anglicisation of the Irish Caitríona or Scottish Gaelic Catrìona, which are forms of the English Katherine.

Bearers of the name

Caitríona
 Caitríona Balfe (born 1979), Irish actress and former model
 Catríona Cannon (born 1968), librarian and academic
 Caitríona O'Leary (born 1969), Irish singer
 Caitríona O'Reilly (born 1973), Irish poet and critic
 Caitríona Ruane (born 1962), Irish politician
 Caitríona Ryan, Irish camogie player

Caitriona
 Caitriona Beggs (born 1977), Irish cricketer
 Caitriona Jennings (born 1980), Irish athlete
 Caitriona Reed (born 1949), American Buddhist teacher

Catriona
 Catriona Carey, Irish field hockey and camogie player
 Catriona Cuddihy, Irish athlete
 Catriona Fallon, American rower
 Catriona Forrest, Scottish field hockey player
 Catriona Grant, Scottish politician
 Catriona Gray, Filipino-Australian beauty pageant titleholder who won Miss Universe 2018
 Catriona Le May Doan, Canadian speedskater
 Catriona MacColl, English actress
 Catriona MacDonald, traditional fiddle player from Shetland
 Catriona MacInnes, Scottish film-maker
 Catriona Matthew, Scottish professional golfer
 Catriona Millar, Scottish painter
 Catriona Morison, Scottish opera singer, Winner of Cardiff Singer of the World competition 2017
 Catriona Morrison, Scottish triathlete
 Catriona Oliver, now Sens, Australian rower
 Catriona Power, Irish camogie player
 Catriona Rowntree, now Pettit, Australian television presenter
 Catriona Seth (born 1964), British scholar of French literature and the history of ideas
 Catriona Shearer, Scottish journalist
 Catriona (Cat) Sparks, Australian science fiction writer, editor and publisher
 Catriona Sturton, Canadian musician

Catrìona
 Catrìona Lexy Chaimbeul (born 1982), Scottish writer and actor
 Catrìona Nic Fhearghais ( 1746), Scottish Gaelic poet
 Catrìona Shaw, Scottish artist and musician 

Given names
Irish-language feminine given names
Scottish feminine given names
English-language feminine given names